Pears (Pyrus species) are used as food plants by the caterpillars of a number of Lepidoptera (butterflies and moths). These include:

 Bucculatricidae
 Several Bucculatrix leaf-miner species:
B. bechsteinella
B. crataegi
B. pomifoliella
B. pyrivorella
 Coleophoridae
 Several Coleophora case-bearer species:
 C. anatipennella – recorded on European pear (P. communis)
 C. cerasivorella
 C. hemerobiella
 C. malivorella
 C. nigricella
 C. paripennella
 C. siccifolia
 C. spinella (apple-and-plum case-bearer) – recorded on European pear (P. communis)
 Geometridae
 Chloroclystis rectangulata (green pug)
 Colotois pennaria (feathered thorn)
 Ectropis crepuscularia (engrailed)
 Erannis defoliaria (mottled umber)
 Operophtera brumata (winter moth)
 Selenia tetralunaria (purple thorn)
 Lymantriidae
 Euproctis chrysorrhoea (brown-tail)
 Noctuidae
 Acronicta psi (grey dagger)
 Acronicta tridens (dark dagger)
 Cosmia trapezina (dun-bar)
 Eupsilia transversa (satellite)
 Naenia typica (gothic)
 Orthosia cerasi (common Quaker)
 Phlogophora meticulosa (angle shades)
 Xestia c-nigrum (setaceous Hebrew character)
 Nolidae
 Nola cucullatella (short-cloaked moth)
 Saturniidae
 Pavonia pavonia (emperor moth)
 Tortricidae
 Enarmonia formosana (cherrybark tortrix) – on bark
 Epiphyas postvittana (light brown apple moth)
 Cydia pomonella (codling moth)
 Yponomeutidae
 Scythropia crataegella (hawthorn moth)

External links 

Pyrus
+Lepidoptera